Vanessa Cailhol is a French actress, dancer and singer, born in Toulouse.

Career 
Born in Toulouse, Vanessa grew up in Aveyron, and her passion for dancing encouraged her to choose a secondary curriculum with a special emphasis on dance, in Rodez. In 2000; she gets into the Besso Ballet, the junior ballet company in Toulouse, then the ballet dancing at the Geneva Dance Center in Genève. After various shows and attracted by singing and acting, Vanessa joins the French “Academie Internationale de Comédie Musicale” in Paris and then, the Cours Florent.

For her first experience on stage, she played the part of Mowgli in The Jungle Book, and then took several parts one after the other, such as The Prince and the Pauper, Coups de foudre, Grease, Les Misérables, Peter Pan, Fiddler on the Roof... In 2010, she played Lisa, and Sophie’s understudy in the musical Mamma Mia!. In 2011 she joined the Cabaret (musical)'''s troop at the Théâtre Marigny where she played Frenchie, and Claire Pérot’s understudy – the leading part of Sally Bowles.

In October 2013, and January 2014, she played the title role in Pinocchio, le spectacle musical in Paris.

 Charity contribution 
Since 2011, she has patronized the association Coeurs en scène. In 2013, she played an active part in the single Un faux départ, with Les grandes voix des comédies musicalesLes grandes voix des comédies musicales présentent le clip Un faux départ , ptitblog.net, 28 November 2013, retrieved 2014-02-26 and, among others, Renaud Hantson, Mikelangelo Loconte, and Lââm.

 Ballet dancing 
 2004 : Giselle, La Fille mal gardée, Carmen – Ballet Junior Besso Amantico
 2004–2005 : Pergolese – Ballet Junior Classique de Genève
 2005 : Graines de sable – By Paolo Nocéra at Grand Casino de Genève
 2005 : Paquita – Ballet Junior Classique de Genève
 2006 : Dancers days, Partitas, La nuit de Noël – Compagnie Moves and Lines / Soliste
 2006–2008 : Fluide, D'ici et d'ailleurs by Misook Seo – Festival d'Avignon, tour, Romania, Edinburgh International Festival, Café de la Danse
 2007 : The Nutcracker – Compagnie Choryphée
 2008 : Les noces de Jeannette by Victor Massé, dir by Patricia Samuel – Festival de Lamallous

 Theatre 
 2008 : Wayra et le sorcier de la grande montagne by Valentina Arce – Tour
 2013–2014 : Tatrod'lachance by Amar Mostefaoui and Richard Taxy – Théâtre les Feux de la Rampe, Festival d'Avignon, tour

 Operetta 
 2011 : Andalousie by Raymond Vincy, dir by Carole Clin    
 2011 : 4 jours à Paris by Raymond Vincy and Albert Willemetz, dir by Frédéric L'Huillier
 2011–2012 : La Route fleurie by Francis Lopez and Raymond Vincy, dir by Fabrice Lelièvre – Théâtre de Villeurbanne and dir by Pierre Sybil – Théâtre de Dole
 2012 : Andalousie de Raymond Vincy, mes de Pierre Sybil – Aix-les-Bains
 2013 : Luis Mariano/Francis Lopez de Fabrice Lelièvre – Palais des congrès de Paris – Aix-les-Bains
 2013 : Le Chanteur de Mexico by Francis Lopez, dir by Pierre Sybil – Théâtre de Dole
 2013 : 4 jours à Paris by Raymond Vincy and Albert Willemetz, dir by Emmanuel Marfolia – Théâtre lyrique de Saint-Marcel, Théâtre de Troyes
 2013 : La Périchole by Jacques Offenbach, dir by Jean-Philippe Corre
 2013–2014 : Violettes impériales by Vincent Scotto, dir by de Pierre Sybil – Théâtre d'Opérette de Lyon
 2013–2014 : The White Horse Inn by Ralph Benatzky, dir by Jacques Duparc – Théâtre de Tourcoing, Bordeaux
 2014 : Méditerranée by Raymond Vincy and Francis Lopez – Mons
 2014 : La Belle de Cadix, mes Fabrice Lelièvre – Aix les Bains

 Musicals 

 2007–2008 :  The Jungle Book, dir by de Brice Tripart – Théâtre de Paris, tour
 2008 : L'homme qui rit – Vingtième Théâtre
 2008 : Le fabuleux voyage de la fée Mélodie by Stéphanie Marino, dir by Nicolas Devort –  Tour
 2008–2009 : The Prince and the Pauper – Théâtre Tallia, Théâtre Marsoulan, Le Trianon
 2008–2010 : Grease by Jim Jacobs and Warren Casey, dir by Olivier Bénézech and Jeanne Deschaux – Théâtre Comédia, Palais des congrès de Paris
 2009 : Les Misérables de Claude-Michel Schönberg, Alain Boublil and Jean-Marc Natel, dir by Gérard Demierre – Tour, Lausanne
 2009 : Coups de foudre, dir by Jean-Baptiste Arnal – Vingtième Théâtre, Théâtre Musical Marsoulan
 2009–2010 : Peter Pan, dir by Guy Grimbert – Théâtre des Variétés and tour
 2010 : Fiddler on the Roof, dir by Jeanne Deschaux – Le Palace
 2010–2011 : Mamma Mia! by Benny Andersson and Björn Ulvaeus, Phyllida Lloyd – Théâtre Mogador
 2011–2012 :  Cabaret (musical) by and dir by Sam Mendes and Rob Marshall – Théâtre Marigny, tour 
 2012 : La revanche d'une blonde – Le Palace
 2012 : Les instants volés by Cyrille Garit and Stève Perrin, dir by Jean-Charles Mouveaux-Mayeur – Théâtre Michel 
 2012–2013 : Peter Pan – Guy Grimbert – Bobino
 2012–2013 : La nuit de Noël by and dir by Virginie Bienaimée – Living Museum of the Horse at Chantilly
 2013 : L'Hôtel des Roches Noires by Stéphane Corbin and Françoise Cadol, dir by Christophe Luthringer – Festival d'Avignon, tour
 2013 : Christophe Colomb by Gérôme Gallo and Gérald Dellorta – Vingtième Théâtre
 2013 : Le fabuleux voyage de la fée Mélodie by Stéphanie Marino, dir by Nicolas Devort – Tour
 2013–2014 : Pinocchio, le spectacle musical by Marie-Jo Zarb and Moria Némo, dir by Marie-Jo Zarb – Théâtre de Paris, tour

 Filmography 
 2007 : Rêver c'est possible by Nils Tavernier, short
 2012 : La nouvelle Blanche-Neige by Laurent Bénégui

 Discography 
 2011 : Le chemin, for the NGO Winds Peace Japan 2013 : Un faux départ, with the collective Les grandes voix des comédies musicales 2013 : La nuit de Noël : 
 Si j'étais une sorcière 
 La supplique des ailes Le temps presse Retour sur terre 2013 : Pinocchio, le spectacle musical''

References

External links 
 Official Site

Living people
Actresses from Toulouse
Cours Florent alumni
French female dancers
French women singers
French musical theatre actresses
Year of birth missing (living people)